Palmadusta androyensis consanguinea is a species of sea snail, a cowry, a marine gastropod mollusk in the family Cypraeidae, the cowries.

Description
The shell size varies between 15 mm and 19 mm

Distribution
This subspecies is distributed in the Indian Ocean along East Africa and Madagascar

References
Notes

Bibliography
 Bozzetti L. (2006) Palmadusta androyensis ipacoyana (Gastropoda: Cypraeidae) nuova sottospecie dal Madagascar Meridionale. Malacologia Mostra Mondiale 53: 3–4

External links
 
  L. LImpalaër, Trois trésors Malgaches

Cypraeidae